Haley Daniels (born 14 December 1990) is a Canadian slalom canoeist who has competed at the international level since 2010.

Daniels started canoeing at age 6 and competing at age 12 in Calgary. She made her senior international debut in 2008 and won the bronze medal in the Pan American Games, Toronto, in 2015. With women’s canoeing events finally added to the Olympic slate for the 2020 Tokyo Games Daniels secured qualification for the delayed event in June 2021. Daniels represented Canada in the inaugural edition of the C1 event at the Tokyo Games, finishing in 22nd place after being eliminated in the heats.

Personal life
Her grandfather was a Grey Cup Champion playing for the Toronto Argos in the 1950 mud bowl.  He also played for the Winnipeg Blue Bombers and Montreal Alouettes football teams.

References

External links 

1990 births
Living people
Canoeists at the 2015 Pan American Games
Canadian female canoeists
Medalists at the 2015 Pan American Games
Pan American Games bronze medalists for Canada
Pan American Games medalists in canoeing
Sportspeople from Calgary
Canoeists at the 2020 Summer Olympics
Olympic canoeists of Canada
21st-century Canadian women
20th-century Canadian women